Drug Research is a peer-reviewed medical journal covering drug development published by Thieme Medical Publishers. The journal was established in 1951 and the editor-in-chief is Martin Wehling (Heidelberg University Faculty of Medicine in Mannheim).

Abstracting and indexing 
Drug Research is abstracted and indexed in:
Biological Abstracts
Chemical Abstracts
Excerpta Medica
Index Medicus
Nuclear Science Abstracts
According to the Journal Citation Reports, it has a 2014 impact factor of 0.701, ranking it 121st out of 157 journals in the category "Chemistry, multidisciplinary" and 229th out of 254 journals in the category "Pharmacology & Pharmacy".

References

External links
 

Pharmacology journals
English-language journals
Publications established in 1951
Monthly journals
Thieme academic journals